WYXX (97.7 FM, "Rock 97.7") is a radio station broadcasting a classic rock music format. The station previously simulcast WSMM 102.3 FM New Carlisle, Indiana, USA. Licensed to Goshen, Indiana, the station serves the South Bend area. The station is currently owned by Sound Management, LLC.

History
On April 7, 2011, WZOW changed its call letters to WSSM and changed its format from classic rock to oldies, branded as "The Stream". Programming on WSMM/WSSM came from Westwood One Local's Classic Hits/Pop format.

WSMM/WSSM also played continuous Christmas music during the Christmas season. The station changed its call sign back to WZOW on December 19, 2013, and changed its callsign back to WSSM on June 11, 2014.

On October 10, 2016, the station switched to a classic rock format, branded as "Rock 97.7", and changed its callsign to WYXX. It also picked up The Bob & Tom Show which had been dropped a week before by WQLQ when it switched to a top 40/CHR format.

References

External links
Rock 97.7 Official website

YXX
Classic rock radio stations in the United States